
Seven Royal Navy ships have been named HMS Duncan, after Admiral Adam Duncan, 1st Viscount Duncan of Camperdown, hero of the Battle of Camperdown.
 HMS Duncan (1804) was the mercantile Carron, launched at Bombay Dockyard in 1792. She made three voyages from India to Britain for the British East India Company between 4 November 1795 and 17 June 1801. The Royal Navy purchased her in 1804 for service as a fifth rate and renamed her HMS Dover in 1807. She was wrecked off Madras in 1811.
  was a 74-gun third-rate launched in 1811, reduced to harbour service in 1826, and broken up 1863.
  was a 101-gun screw-propelled first-rate launched in 1859, employed on harbour service as HMS Pembroke in 1890, renamed HMS Tenedos in 1905, and sold in 1910.
 , launched in 1901, was a  that saw action against German installations on the Belgian coast in World War I and was sold in 1920.
  was a D-class destroyer, launched in 1932 and scrapped in 1945.
  was a Type 14 Blackwood-class frigate, launched in 1957 and in service from 1958 to 1985.
  is a Type 45 destroyer launched on 11 October 2010.

Battle honours
Ships named Duncan have earned the following battle honours:
Spartivento, 1940
Malta Convoys, 1941
Mediterranean, 1941
Atlantic, 1941–45
Diego Suarez, 1942

See also

Citations and references

Citations

References
Hackman, Rowan (2001) Ships of the East India Company. (Gravesend, Kent: World Ship Society). 

Royal Navy ship names